Glenn Canfield Jr. (September 20, 1935 – January 30, 2006) was an American metallurgist and businessman.

Early life
Glenn Canfield Jr. was born September 20, 1935, in Springfield, Illinois to Ruth K. and Glenn Canfield. He was the first of four children. He served in the United States Navy, earning the rank of Aviation Structural Mechanic Third Class. He served in the Korean and China Sea areas and was discharged after the Korean War.

Education
Canfield graduated from the University of Illinois in 1959 with a bachelor's degree in metallurgical engineering. He was second in his class of engineers. He earned an MBA from the University of Texas at Tyler in 1987.

Career
After graduating from the University of Illinois, Canfield worked for Allegheny Ludlum Steel Co. in Brackenridge, Pennsylvania. The first computers were just being built. He did some work on the supercomputer ILLIAC, programming it with wires since chips had not been invented.

In December 1960, Canfield was let go by Allegheny Ludlum when the steel industry went into a funk and went to work for Westinghouse Electric building nuclear reactors for submarines and the first aircraft carrier, and for electrical power plants. His job was to make the fuel. His team designed a backyard reactor that could have supplied 10 homes for 20 years with very cheap power but access to needed uranium was unavailable.

In December 1963, Canfield went to work at Latrobe Steel as a metallurgist in heat treating and melting of tool steels.

In January 1970, Canfield went to work at Crucible Specialty Metals in Syracuse, New York making powdered high speed steels, something very new at that time and the forerunner to many alloys that are made now for intricate parts with a long life.

Canfield spent the last 32 years of his life in Longview, Texas, working for Lone Star Steel and developing several businesses and products, in addition to his work with the Republican Party of Gregg County.

In 1986, Canfield formed The Plum Group, publishing monthly reports on the metal industry to steel suppliers. He also formed Thermo-Tech Co., a manufacturer of de-oxidation products for the steel industry.

His works included pioneering work in powder metallurgy, fusion bonding of nuclear materials for reactors in Naval and Power Generation, early work in powdered nuclear materials now used in modern reactors, development of high energy compaction of high alloy powders, seamless extrusions, and the removal of oxygen from liquid steels. He held two patents on de-oxidation products and methods.

Politics
Having maintained an interest in political and economic issues since college, Mr. Canfield was active in the Republican Party of Gregg County and served as party chairperson from 1991 to 2002. During his term, Republicans captured all but two of the county-wide offices. He also published a monthly newsletter, raised funds for the party, recruited winning candidates, mobilized volunteer efforts, assisted every Republican in winning general elections, and maintained an open office for the use of all auxiliaries. Canfield also served on the State Republican Executive Committee representing Senate District One, having been elected by the state convention in 1998 and being unopposed at the 2000 state convention.

In 2002, Canfield received the Seed Grower Award, a prestigious honor awarded to him for tremendous impact on the growth of the Republican presence in the state of Texas.

Death
Canfield died from cancer on January 30, 2006.

References

1935 births
2006 deaths
Deaths from cancer in Texas
American metallurgists
People from Longview, Texas
People from Springfield, Illinois
Businesspeople from Texas
Texas Republicans
United States Navy non-commissioned officers
Grainger College of Engineering alumni
University of Texas at Tyler alumni
20th-century American businesspeople